Dunbar Street is a road in Vancouver, British Columbia, Canada. The street runs through the Dunbar–Southlands neighbourhood from 51st Avenue and the Point Grey Golf and Country Club in the south and continues to the north as Alma Street, via the Dunbar Diversion. The built-up commercial area along Dunbar Street is surrounded predominantly by single-family propertiesthe only such commercial strip in Vancouver. Separately, Dunbar Street runs through West Point Grey as a narrow residential road, from 13th Avenue to Point Grey Road.

The commercial area along Dunbar is resistant to change; many businesses in the area have been established in their locations for more than 50 years. Examples include Dunbar Cycles, which opened in 1927, Stong's Market, which opened in 1931, and the Dunbar Theatre, which has been in business since 1935. TransLink runs two routes along Dunbar Street and maintains the Dunbar Loop at the intersection of Dunbar and 41st Avenue. Route 7 provides service from the Dunbar Loop to Nanaimo station, and Route 32 is a weekday express bus that runs from the Dunbar Loop to downtown.

Route
Beginning at 16th Avenue near the Dunbar district, the street passes south, intersecting King Edward Avenue and on through 41st Avenue. It mostly passes through residential districts, with the exception near King Edward Avenue and 41st Avenue. It also passes by the Dunbar Loop of TransLink. The route ends at 51st Avenue, where the Point Grey Golf and Country Club lies to the south.

Major intersections

References

Further reading 

 Schofield, Peggy (2007). The Story of Dunbar: Voices of a Vancouver Neighbourhood. Ronsdale Press. .

Streets in Vancouver